Hidden Treasures Fanta Miss Nepal 2016,  the 21st annual Miss Nepal beauty pageant, was held on 8 April 2016 at Hotel Annapurna in Kathmandu. Miss Nepal 2015 Evana Manandhar crowned her successor Asmi Shrestha as Miss Nepal World 2016 to represent Nepal in the Miss World 2016.

At the same event, Roshni Khatri was crowned as Miss Earth Nepal 2016  and Barsha Lekhi was crowned as Miss International Nepal 2016.

The winner of Miss Nepal 2016 served as the brand ambassador of popular drink Fanta and WWF Nepal for a one year. In addition, she received Rs. 100,000 as prize for winning the title. The auditions of Miss Nepal were held in Biratnagar, Birgunj, Chitwan, Nepalgunj, Pokhara, Butwal and Kathmandu.

NTV and NTV PLUS  broadcast the pageant live and for all the Nepalese abroad Miss Nepal 2016 was live streamed on M&S V Magazine's official website.

Results

Color keys

(●): The candidates won the Miss Popular Choice Award (online voting) and got direct entry into Top 11 semi-Finalists.

Sub-titles

Contestants

Previous Experience
 (#1) Asmi Shrestha was the winner of Face of Classic Diamond 2014.
 (#2) Paramita Rana was the 1st runner up in Face of Classic Diamond 2014.
 (#3) Anjana Das was the winner of Miss Pokhara Queen 2015 title.  
 (#4) Priyanka Shrestha was the winner of Miss Purwanchal 2015 which gave her a direct entry to Miss Nepal 2016's Top 19 finalists. 
 (#5) Priyashi Thapa was Miss Nepalgunj 2015 title holder.
 (#6) Pooja Shrestha was 1st runner up at Miss Chitwan 2014 pageant.
 (#7) Anu Rai was 1st runner up at Miss Purwanchal 2015.
 (#8) Sheelpa Maskey was an actress and singer in the UK before coming to compete in Miss Nepal 2016.
 (#9) Sabina Rana Bhujel won the title of Miss Pokhara 2015 which gave her a wild card entry to Miss Nepal 2016's Top 19 finalists.
 (#10) Mangeeta Khannal was the 1st runner up at Miss Pokhara 2015 pageant.
 (#11) Pramisha Bajracharya is 2nd runner up at Miss Purwanchal 2015.
 (#13) Zenisha Tamang was placed 8th at Mega Model Season 3.
 (#14) Samragyee Shah is the 2nd runner up at Face of Classic Diamond 2014.
 (#15) Nitika Sarah Karmacharya has previous won the title of Miss ECollege 2015.
 (#16) Varsha Rai was the 2nd runner up at Miss Purwanchal 2013.
 (#17) Aastha Pokharel is the winner of Kingfisher Calendar Super Model Season 2 and placed 5th at Asia's Next Top Model Cycle 1.
 (#18) Sitoshna Ban was the winner of Miss Chitwan 2014 and previously she competed in Miss Nepal 2014.
 (#19) Lochan Basel is the 2nd runner up at Miss Pokhara 2015.

References

External links
Miss Nepal Website
Miss Nepal Official Website

Beauty pageants in Nepal
2016 beauty pageants
2016 in Nepal
Miss Nepal